Richard Pattinson (1773 – January 1, 1818) was a merchant, ship owner and political figure in Upper Canada. He represented Essex in the Legislative Assembly of Upper Canada from 1812 to 1816.

Born in the Thirteen Colonies, Pattinson lived in Sandwich, Upper Canada. He was involved in the timber trade. Pattinson married Phillis Elinor Askin, the daughter of John Askin. He was a captain in the militia during the War of 1812. Pattinson was a justice of the peace for the Western District. He died in Albany, New York.

References 
Becoming Prominent: Leadership in Upper Canada, 1791-1841, J.K. Johnson (1989)

1773 births
1818 deaths
Members of the Legislative Assembly of Upper Canada
Canadian justices of the peace